Arthropogon is a genus of South American and Caribbean bunchgrass plants in the grass family.

Species
Species include:
 Arthropogon filifolius Filg. — endemic to Brazil, in Goiás and Minas Gerais states, and the Distrito Federal.
 Arthropogon piptostachyus (Griseb.) Pilg. — Cuba, Jamaica.
 Arthropogon sorengii Gir.-Cañas — endemic to Colombia, in Vaupés Department.
 Arthropogon villosus Nees — Brazil, Bolivia.
 Arthropogon xerachne Ekman — endemic to Brazil, in São Paulo and Paraná states.

Formerly included
Some species formerly in Arthropogon are reclassified in the genera Altoparadisium or Canastra, and include:
 Arthropogon bolivianus — Altoparadisium scabrum  
 Arthropogon lanceolatus — Canastra lanceolata 
 Arthropogon rupestris — Altoparadisium scabrum  
 Arthropogon scaber — Altoparadisium scabrum

See also
 List of Poaceae genera

References

Panicoideae
Poaceae genera
Bunchgrasses of North America
Bunchgrasses of South America
Flora of the Caribbean
Grasses of Brazil